Sintetik is the second album production by the Dominican based electronic rock band Tabu Tek. Released in 1999, the album spanned many local hits in the Dominican rock scene but, as their previous albums, didn't push them to international success . Songs like El Precio managed to get rotation in MTV-LA while most of the songs climbed the top positions of the rock charts of the radio stations in the country. This was their last full-length album released by Tabu Tek and the band has since ceased producing any new material.

Track listing

El Precio
Sed
Algun Dia
Doble Cara
Circulos
Mentiras
Suenos A
Amor Virtual
Preguntas Al Azar
Caja Gris
Entre Espejos
Ayer
Azul Cyan
Girar (remix)

1999 albums